Paul Auguste Marie Adam (7 December 1862 – 1 January 1920) was a French novelist who became an early proponent of Symbolism in France, and one of the founders of the Symbolist review Le Symboliste.

Career
Adam's first novel, Chair molle ("Soft Flesh"), was the story of a prostitute in the Naturalist manner, which led to him being prosecuted for immorality before the Cour d'assises and sentenced to a fortnight in prison and a 500-franc fine. Together with Jean Moréas, he co-wrote Les Demoiselles Goubert, a novel that marked the transition between Naturalism and Symbolism in French literature. His Lettres de Malaisie (1897) was speculative fiction about politics in the future. He also wrote a series of historical novels that dealt with the period of the Napoleonic Wars and their aftermath; the first installment in the series, La Force, was published in 1899. It was followed by L'enfant d'Austerlitz (1901), La ruse (1902) and Au soleil de Juillet (1903). His novel Stephanie, which appeared in 1913, argued in favour of arranged marriages as opposed to those founded on romantic attachments. His work was part of the literature event in the art competition at the 1912 Summer Olympics.

He was born and died in Paris.

Works

 Chair molle (1885)
 Soi (1886)
 Les Demoiselles Goubert (with Jean Moréas, 1886)
 Le Thé chez Miranda (with Jean Moréas, 1886)
 La glèbe (1887)
 Les Volontés merveilleuses: Être (1888)
 Les Volontés merveilleuses: L'essence de soleil (1890)
 Les Volontés merveilleuses: en décor (1890)
 L'Époque: Le Vice filial (1891)
 L'Époque: Robes rouges (1891)
 L'Époque: Les Cœurs utiles (1892)
 L'Automne (1893, a censored play)
 Le Conte futur (1893)
 Critique des mœurs (1893)
 Les Images sentimentales (1893)
 Princesses byzantines (1893)
 La Parade amoureuse (1894)
 Le Mystère des foules (1895)
 Les Cœurs nouveaux (1896)
 La Force du mal (1896)
 L'Année de Clarisse (1897, illustrated by Gaston Darbour)
 La bataille d'Uhde (1897)
 Le Vice filial (1898, illustrated by Jan Dědina)
 Le Temps et la Vie:
 La Force (1899)
 L'Enfant d'Austerlitz (1901)
 La Ruse, 1827-1828 (1903)
 Au soleil de juillet, 1829-1830 (1903)
 Basile et Sophia (1901)
 Lettres de Malaisie (1898)
 Le Troupeau de Clarisse (1904)
 Le Serpent noir (1905)
 Vues d'Amérique (1906)
 Clarisse et l'homme heureux (1907)
 La Morale des Sports (1907)
 La cité prochaine (1908)
 Les Impérialismes et la morale des peuples (1908)
 Le Malaise du monde latin (1910)
 Le Trust (1910)
 Contre l’Aigle (1910)
 Stéphanie (1913)
 Le Lion d'Arras (1919)
 Notre Carthage (1922)
 Dieu (1924, published posthumously in La Phalange)

Further reading

References

External links

 
 
 
 Works by Paul Adam at Hathi Trust
Signac, 1863-1935, a fully digitized exhibition catalog from The Metropolitan Museum of Art Libraries, which contains material on Paul Adam (see index)

1862 births
1920 deaths
Writers from Paris
19th-century French novelists
French historical novelists
French erotica writers
20th-century French novelists
20th-century French male writers
French art critics
French male novelists
19th-century French male writers
French male non-fiction writers
Olympic competitors in art competitions
French anarchists